Kukus Stadium is a multi-purpose stadium in Strumica, North Macedonia. It is used mostly for football matches and is currently the home stadium of Akademija Pandev and FK Horizont Turnovo. The stadium holds 1,500 people.

References

FK Horizont Turnovo
Football venues in North Macedonia
Sport in Strumica
Kukuš